Shirinabad may refer to:
Shirinabad, East Azerbaijan
Shirinabad, Golestan
Shirinabad, Hamadan
Shirinabad, Malayer, Hamadan Province
Shirinabad, Ilam
Shirinabad, Kerman
Shirinabad, Kermanshah
Shirinabad, Markazi
Shirinabad, Razavi Khorasan